Carlos Pérez Rial, (born 12 April 1979 in Cangas do Morrazo, Pontevedra) nicknamed "Perucho", is a Spanish sprint canoer who has been competing since 1999. Competing in two Summer Olympics, he won a gold in the K-2 500 m event at Beijing in 2008.

Pérez won seven medals at the ICF Canoe Sprint World Championships with three golds (K-1 200 m: 2005, K-1 4 × 200 m: 2009, 2010) and four silvers (K-1 200 m: 2006, K-1 500 m: 2003, K-2 200 m: 2009, 2010).

Perucho is a member of the Piragüismo Aldán club. He is 182 cm (6'0") tall and weighs 84 kg (185 lb).

European Championship Medals
 Silver K-1  200 m   2006 Račice, Czech Republic  0:34.644
 Gold   K-1  200 m  2005 Poznań, Poland  0:36.098
 Bronze K-1  500 m  2004 Poznań, Poland  1:41.974

References
Canoe09.ca profile

1979 births
Canoeists at the 2004 Summer Olympics
Canoeists at the 2008 Summer Olympics
Sportspeople from Galicia (Spain)
Living people
Olympic canoeists of Spain
Olympic gold medalists for Spain
Spanish male canoeists
Olympic medalists in canoeing
ICF Canoe Sprint World Championships medalists in kayak
Medalists at the 2008 Summer Olympics
Mediterranean Games gold medalists for Spain
Mediterranean Games silver medalists for Spain
Competitors at the 2005 Mediterranean Games
Competitors at the 2013 Mediterranean Games
Mediterranean Games medalists in canoeing